Dr. Pradnya Rajeev Satav (Marathi: प्रज्ञा राजीव सातव)  is an Indian politician belonging to the Indian National Congress. She was elected unopposed by election in November 2021  to the Legislative Council by MLAs. She is also serving as a Vice President of Maharashtra Pradesh Congress Committee since August 2021.

Life
Satav is the widow of former MP  from Maharashtra Rajeev Satav. He died of complications as a result of COVID-19 on 16 May 2021 at the age of 46. The seat of Sharad Ranpise became vacant when he died on 23 September 2021 and Satav was put forward as the Congress Party Candidate. The BJP candidate was Sanjay Khedekar but he withdrew before the election leaving Satav to be elected unopposed. Sanjay Khedekar had withdrawn at the request of Devendra Fadnavis after he was requested to not have a BJP candidate by Congress party leaders.

She is the only woman MLC from the Congress Party in Maharashtra. Her husband shared close relations with the Gandhi family.

References

Indian National Congress politicians
Members of the Maharashtra Legislative Council
1976 births
Living people